Aandha Prem is a 2003 Bengali romantic drama film directed by Narayan Chatterjee under the banner of  Shiv Films. The film features actors Prosenjit Chatterjee and Rachana Banerjee in the lead roles. Music of the film has been composed by Babul Bose.

Plot
Sima and Bijoy are two college students who initially hate each other. However, with time, they fall in love, but face opposition from Sima's wealthy father.

Cast 
 Prosenjit Chatterjee as Bijoy
 Rachana Banerjee as Sima
 Laboni Sarkar
 Deepankar De
 Anuradha Ray
 Mrinal Mukherjee
 Koushik Bandyopadhyay
 Nabamita Chattopadhyay
 Joy Badlani
 Kalyani Mondal

References

External links
 Aandha-Prem-Bengali-Movie-Watch-Online
 www.in.com/tv/movies/etv-bangla-115/andho-prem-35361
 www.induna.com/1000005176-productdetails/
 Aandha Prem Online Movie
 Aandha Prem The Movie
 www.gomolo.com/andha-prem-movie-cast-crew/15261

Bengali-language Indian films
2003 films
2000s Bengali-language films
Films scored by Babul Bose

Indian romantic drama films